Runcorn is a town in England.

Runcorn may also refer to:

 4570 Runcorn, a minor planet
 Keith Runcorn (1922–1995), geophysicist
 Runcorn (UK Parliament constituency)
 Runcorn railway station in the English town
 Runcorn Glacier in Antarctica
 Runcorn, Queensland, a suburb of Brisbane, Australia
 Runcorn Urban District, a former local government district in Cheshire, England
 Runcorn Rural District, a former local government district in Cheshire, England

See also
 Runcorn Bridge (disambiguation)